Hydraulic warfare (HW) is the use of water from reservoirs, rivers, canals, and other water features to impede the operations of an opposing force. This may involve breaching dams and rerouting watercourses. It can be used to impede the advance of an attacker or to reduce the resources and tactical options for defenders. The technique has been used to create "devastating floods, isolate troops, cut off supply lines, hinder river crossings, and disrupt military timetables".

History 
Between the years 1500 and 2000, some 1/3 of floods in the Netherlands southwest were deliberately caused during wartime. The tactic was typically ineffective, and had damaged the land and local population.

In 1938, China breached the dikes of the Yellow River to slow the advance of Japanese forces during the Second Sino-Japanese War. The flood  became known as the largest such act in history.

HW was used by Finland and the USSR during World War II. British forces destroyed the Moehne and Edersee Dams in Western Germany to cut off the supply of water, power, river navigation, and flood protection to the Nazi regime. The breach of the Moehne dam unleashed a flood of 310,000 cfs, costing 1,200 lives. Bridges were washed out for 30 miles below the dam, and two power plants were submerged. The destruction of the Edersse dam produced similar flows and damaged infrastructure all the way to the Mittelland canal. Navigation was also disrupted as no water was available to stabilize the level of water in the river. Germany struck again by flooding the Pontine marshes in Italy, slowing the advance of Allied forces. Germany also flooded the Ay and Ill rivers in France and the Rur river in Germany.

German forces flooded the Liri, Garigliano, and Rapido Rivers in Italy in early 1944. The Garigliano flood disrupted a British crossing, with knock-on effects on the Battle of Monte Cassino. Conversely, the Germans dammed up the Rapido river below an attempted crossing, creating a quagmire and delaying the operation.

The term originated in the 1950s, with the US Army Corps of Engineers.

In 2022, the appearance of flooded areas indicated the use of HW during the Russian invasion of Ukraine.

References

External links 

 

Warfare by type
Russo-Ukrainian War